Robert Penn (1872–1912) was a U.S. sailor and Medal of Honor recipient.

Robert Penn or Rob Penn may also refer to:

Robert Penn (musician), American blues musician
Rob Penn (born 1967), British writer and broadcaster
Robert Penne, MP for Weymouth and Melcombe Regis UK Parliament constituencies in the early 15th century

See also
Robert Penn Warren (1905–1989), American poet, novelist, and literary critic